Estopinal is a surname. Notable people with the surname include:

 Albert Estopinal (1845–1919), American planter
 Wayne Estopinal (1955–2018), American architect and founder of Louisville City FC